The Giant Mountains, Krkonoše, or Karkonosze (Czech: , Polish:), are a mountain range located in the north of the Czech Republic and the south-west of Poland, part of the Sudetes mountain system (part of the Bohemian Massif). The Czech-Polish border, which divides the historic regions of Bohemia and Silesia, runs along the main ridge.

On both sides of the border, large areas of the mountains are designated national parks (the Krkonoše National Park in the Czech Republic and the Karkonosze National Park in Poland), and these together constitute a cross-border biosphere reserve under the UNESCO Man and the Biosphere Programme. The source of the River Elbe is within the Giant Mountains. The range has a number of major ski resorts, and is a popular destination for tourists engaging in downhill and cross-country skiing, hiking, cycling and other activities.

Names

The Czech name "Krkonoše" is first mentioned (in the singular, as "Krkonoš") in a 1492 record of the division of the Manor of Štěpanice into two parts. The first map occurrence of the name dates back to 1518 to Klaudyán map of Bohemia, when it is referred to the mountains as "Krkonoss". The origin of the name is usually interpreted as a compound of "krk" or "krak" – an Old Slavonic word for Krummholz (a reference to the local vegetation) – and "noš" – derived from "nosit" (to carry). Alternative linguistic theories mention a connection with the pre-Indo-European word Corconti, which is first listed by Ptolemy and refers to a pre-Celtic or Germanic people.

In Simon Hüttel's chronicle of Trautenau (Trutnov) from 1549 the names Hrisenpergisches Gebirge, Hrisengepirge, Hrisengebirge, Risengepirge appeared for the first time, but in the following centuries several other names were still used too. Martin Helwig's map of Silesia mentions Riſenberg (Risenberg).

In 1380, Přibík Pulkava called the mountains the Sněžné hory (Snowy Mountains). The Czech writer Bohuslav Balbín recorded in 1679 that the mountains were known under various names: Krkonoše (Cerconossios), Rhipaeos Montes, Obrovski Mountains, Snow Mountains or Riesen Gebirge.

The modern names of Krkonoše (Czech), Riesengebirge (German) and Karkonosze (Polish) became widely accepted only in the 19th century. The range is also often referred to in English as the "Giant Mountains".

Geography 

While most of the Sudetes are middle-sized Mittelgebirge mountains, the Giant Mountains have a few characteristics of proper high mountains such as glacial cirques, small periglacial landforms and an elevation significantly above the tree line.

The main ridge of the mountains runs from east to west and forms the border between these two countries. Its highest peak, Sněžka-Śnieżka, is the highest peak of the Czech Republic. The Silesian northern part, in Poland, drops steeply to the Jelenia Góra valley, whereas the southern Czech part slopes gently to the Bohemian basin. In the north-easterly direction the Giant Mountains continue to Rudawy Janowickie, and in the south-east to Rýchory. The pass Novosvětský průsmyk (Polish:Przełęcz Szklarska) at Jakuszyce forms the western border with the Jizera Mountains.
The Bohemian ridge in the Czech Republic, running parallel to the main ridge, forms a second ridge (also called inner ridge). At Špindlerův Mlýn the river Elbe divides the Bohemian ridge.

The ridges are divided by the rivers Elbe, Mumlava, Bílé Labe, Velka Úpa, Malá Úpa and Jizera, which originates in the Jizera mountains. The rivers on the Czech side often fall over steep edges into valleys formed by ice-age glaciers. The most important rivers on the Polish side are Kamienna, Łomnica and Bóbr (Bober). They also form impressive waterfalls, such as Wodospad Kamieńczyka, Wodospad Szklarki ( Wodospad na Łomnicy or Wodospad Podgórnej.

The main ridge of the Giant Mountains forms the watershed between the North Sea and the Baltic. The rivers on the south side drain into the North Sea, those on the north side into the Baltic.

Highest peaks and peaks of interest

Flora
The river valleys and lower layers form the sub-montane zone. The aboriginal hardwood and mixed forests are largely replaced with spruce monocultures. Only the river valleys offer remnants of hardwood forests.

The higher parts form the montane vegetation zone. Their natural coniferous forests have also in large parts been replaced by spruce monocultures, which are often heavily damaged due to air pollution and soil acidification. In many places, the forest is dead. This is due to the geographic location in the Black Triangle, a region around the German-Polish-Czech border triangle with many coal-burning power plants. The sulfur dioxide emissions, which are mainly responsible for acid rain, and the emission of many other concentrations have been greatly reduced since the beginning of the 1990s, but the forest die-back, which started in the 1970s and culminated in the late 1980s, could not be stopped entirely.

The clearing of forests in the surroundings of mountain huts created species-rich mountain meadows, which were maintained in alpine pasture farming. After the expulsion of Germans in 1945, this type of management largely came to a standstill and the mountain meadows were largely abandoned.

This habitat of special importance in the Krkonoše is a relic of Arctic tundra, which was typical in Central Europe during the ice age. At the same time, however, there was a connection to the alpine grasslands of the Alps, and plant species coexist here which are otherwise separated by several thousand kilometers, such as cloudberries. Some species evolved under the specific conditions of the Krkonoše unlike in the Alps or in the tundra, especially in Śnieżne Kotły. They are endemic, which means they only appear here.

The alpine vegetation zone, with large rocky deserts, can only be found on the highest peaks (Sněžka, Luční hora, Studniční hora, Kotel and Szrenica). Only grass, moss and lichen survive here.

Especially species-rich are glacial cirques such as the Obří důl, Labský důl and Důl Bílého Labe on the south side and the dramatic Śnieżne Kotły, Kocioł Łomniczki and the calderas of mountain lakes Wielki Staw and Mały Staw on the north side of the main ridge. The species-richest areas are called zahrádka ("garden"). There are about 15 in Krkonoše, for example Čertova zahrádka und Krakonošova zahrádka.

National parks and nature reserves

On both the Czech and Polish side, large parts of the mountain range are protected as national parks and nature reserves.

The Czech Krkonoše National Park (Krkonošský národní park, KRNAP) was created in 1963 as the second national park in Czechoslovakia, making it the oldest national park in the Czech Republic.

The strict conservation regulations of the Polish national park prohibit reforestation of damaged and dead forests. On the Czech side, however, large-scale reforestation projects are common.

Climate

The climate of the Giant Mountains is marked by frequent weather changes. The winters are cold and snow depths above  are not uncommon. Many parts of the mountains are covered with snow for five or six months. There is often dense fog at the higher altitudes. On average, mount Sněžka/Śnieżka is at least partly hidden in fog and/or clouds on 296 days, and has an average of about 0.2 °C, which is similar to places much further north, like Iceland. The main ridge is one of the most wind-exposed areas of Europe. On the northern side the Foehn wind is a frequent meteorological phenomenon.

History

Until the High Middle Ages the mountain range and its foothills were unpopulated, with deep, impenetrable forests. The first traces of human settlements probably appeared in the Duchy of Bohemia near two provincial paths between Bohemia and Silesia in the 12th century.

The first wave of colonization by Slavonic settlers goes back to the 13th century in the Kingdom of Bohemia, but only includes the foothills; the mountain ridges were still unpopulated. The second wave of colonization of the foothills in the late 13th century was mostly by German settlers (Ostsiedlung); they first colonized the Silesian northern part, where farming conditions were better, and later the southern Bohemian part along the Elbe and Úpa rivers. Many agricultural settlements, markets and handcraft communities and cities were founded at that time, and they formed a base for the further colonization of the mountain range.

The first people who explored the inner parts of the Giant Mountains were treasure hunters and miners looking for gold, silver, ores and valuable stones, mainly on the Silesian side. In the 14th and 15th centuries foreigners who spoke a non-German language came to the mountains. They were called "Wallen" (see Walha), and their journeys to the "treasure" deposits were recorded in so-called "Wallenbüchern" (Wallen books). Mysterious orientation signs from these "Wallen" are visible to this day, especially on the northern side of the mountains.

At the beginning of the 16th century (1511) German miners from the region around Meissen in Saxony started working in Obří Důl, directly below mount Sněžka/Śnieżka, and at the same time many other mines were opened in other central parts of the mountains, like Svatý Petr, now part of Špindlerův Mlýn.

In the 1530s, Christopher von Gendorf, a Carinthian aristocrat and royal senior captain of King Ferdinand I, appeared in the Krkonoše and obtained the entire dominion of Vrchlabí (Hohenelbe, High Elbe). His enterprising spirit was crucial for the further development of the area. For the supplement of the miners he founded many smaller towns in higher parts of the mountains. Further down in the valleys iron work furnaces were built, and water wheels provided the energy required. Due to the intensive economic activity the first deforested enclaves on hillsides and on the peaks appeared during this period.

By order of Christopher von Gendorf, widespread timber cutting for the silver mine in Kutná Hora started in many places, which caused irreparable damage. These orders led to the third wave of colonization, which fully affected the mountain ridges. In 1566 he invited lumberjacks from Alpine countries to settle in his domain. These people from Tyrol, Carinthia and Styria changed the character of the mountains and shaped the cultural landscape significantly. Hundreds of families, especially from the Tyrol region, created another group of inhabitants who spoke a different German dialect and brought another domestic culture to the Krkonoše. On the mountain hillsides they founded new settlements, laid down the basis for later farming by breeding cattle and built wooden dams to retain the water. By the 17th century the entire mountain range was a densely populated region with meadow enclaves and cottages (called Bauden), which were used during the cattle pasturage in the summer and sometimes even through the winter. Around the same time Albrecht von Wallenstein acquired parts of the mountains, and the town of Vrchlabí (Hohenelbe) served as a base for armament of his army. During that time non-Catholics found refuge in remote places in the mountains. Later entire village communities of non-Catholics from Austrian countries found asylum on the northern side, where they settled in Marysin, Michalovice, Jagnietkow or Karpacz (Krummhübel).

During the 17th century the mountain range on the Bohemian side was divided among new landowners, most of them Catholics and foreign to the region. These included the families of Harrach, Morzin and de Waggi. Disputes about the borders of each domain soon followed, but were settled between 1790 and 1810. Since the Treaty of Berlin (1742) Silesia had become part of the Kingdom of Prussia. The court decision of 1790, which set the border between the Bohemian dominions and the Silesian Schaffgotsch dominions (which family owned the Silesian part of the mountains, as well as large estates in the Jelenia Góra Valley north of them since the Middle Ages), defines the border between Bohemia and Silesia to this day.

At first Bad Warmbrunn (Cieplice Śląskie Zdrój, now a district of Jelenia Góra) with its hot springs became a popular bath and tourist centre on the northern side of the mountains. In 1822 Wilhelm, a brother of Prussian king Frederick William III, was the first prince of the Hohenzollern dynasty who took his summer residence in the Hirschberg (Jelenia Góra) valley, at Fischbach (today Karpniki) castle. In 1831 the king himself bought Erdmannsdorf Estate, which he had learned to appreciate when visiting his brother in Fischbach and the previous owner of Erdmannsdorf, field marshal August von Gneisenau. The valley became a princely hideaway, and in 1838 the king purchased nearby Schildau Castle (today Wojanów) for his daughter Louise, Princess of the Netherlands. Frederick William IV enlarged the Erdmannsdorf manor house. Many new parks were created and manors and palaces rebuilt according to the newest architectural styles.

In 1918 the Republic of Czechoslovakia was founded, and in the following years there was an influx of Czechs on the Bohemian side of the mountains. Usually these people worked for the government (in contrast to the German inhabitants they spoke both Czech and German, which was required), but some of them also worked in the tourism industry and managed mountain huts like Labská bouda (German: Elbfallbaude) and Vosecká bouda (German: Wosseckerbaude). Many of these mountain huts had previously been owned by aristocratic landowners, but were given to the Czech Hikers Club (KCT) after the Land Control Act. This influx was stopped when the Czechoslovakian side of the mountains was occupied by Germany in 1938, and many of these Czechs left the region or were expelled.

After World War II, when the Potsdam Agreement moved the borders of Germany, almost the entire German population was expelled. On the northern Silesian side, Poles, some of whom had been expelled from what was formerly eastern Poland resettled the area, while Czechs re-settled the likewise ethnically cleansed southern, Bohemian side of the mountain range. Today the population density of the area of the national park is two-thirds lower than before World War II, as it is a protected area, and many houses are only used at weekends, for recreational purposes. The population exchange also led to a decline of the cultural landscape. In large parts of the mountains the meadows ran to seed, settlements deracinated, hundreds of traditional houses and mountain huts decayed or turned into architecturally worthless objects and countless memorials, chapels, shrines, landmarks and springs were destroyed, because they were either German-related or ecclesiastic. Absent established Polish names for most of the mountain peaks, new names were issued by political decree in the now Polish northern Giant Mountains to replace the traditional German names.

Mountain huts and rock formations 

Typical for the Giant Mountains are its numerous mountain huts, which are called bouda in Czech and Baude in German. Both names are derived from the Middle High German word Buode, which means booth or building. The Polish name is schronisko. These were mostly named either for the location or for their constructor or occupant. The occupants, however, often changed after the expulsion, and several mountain huts especially on the now Polish side received new names. Entire colonies of mountain huts were called after the families who lived there. They are located in the higher parts or the ridge of the Krkonoše and were used by shepherds as wooden refuges in the summer. After 1800, some of the mountain huts became interesting for the first hikers, and towards the end of the 19th century many were converted into hostels. Later, these huts were often expanded to host a larger number of guests. Well-known historical mountain huts include Luční bouda (Wiesenbaude), Martinova bouda (Martinsbaude) and Vosecká bouda (Wosseckerbaude) in the Czech Republic and Schronisko Strzecha Akademicka (Hampelbaude), Schronisko Samotnia (Teichbaude) and Schronisko na Hali Szrenickiej (Neue Schlesische Baude) in Poland. In other places, the old mountain huts were replaced by newer buildings which were specially built for tourism purposes. Huts from the 20th century include Petrova bouda (Peterbaude) and the hut on the summit of mount Sněžka/Śnieżka.

There are also many impressive rock formations, such as Dívčí kameny-Śląskie Kamienie and Mužské kameny-Czeskie Kamienie, above  on the main ridge, Harrachovy kameny on the Czech side, and Pielgrzymy and Słonecznik in Poland. Similar formations can be found in other parts of the Sudetes.

Tourism 

The Giant Mountains form one of the most traditional tourist areas in Central Europe. As early as the 18th and 19th centuries, ascents of the Schneekoppe (Sněžka) were common, for instance by Theodor Körner and Johann Wolfgang Goethe. Artists like Caspar David Friedrich and Carl Gustav Carus hiked through the mountains to find inspiration. At the end of the 19th century two mountain clubs were founded, the German Riesengebirgsverein (Giant Mountains Club) on the Silesian side and the Austrian Riesengebirgsverein on the Bohemian side. The touristic development of the Krkonoše was one of their goals, and this primarily meant the construction of hiking trails.

As a result, the mountains became one of the most popular vacation areas in the German Empire. During the Gründerzeit (19th century period of industrial and economic growth) many manufacturers from Berlin built numerous holiday villas on the Silesian side, many of which are preserved to this day and provide a special flair, as in Szklarska Poręba (formerly Schreiberhau). Direct rail links to Schreiberhau from Berlin, Breslau, Stettin and Dresden, and later even Deutsche Luft Hansa air links via Hirschberg, enabled a convenient and speedy arrival. On laying out Berlin's Victoria Park on the Kreuzberg between 1888 and 1894 the garden architect Hermann Mächtig designed its waterfall after the Zackelfall (Kamieńczyk Fall) and a gully after Wolfsschlucht (Vlčí rokle in Adršpach).

After 1945 and the expulsion of the German inhabitants, ski resorts expanded with new lifts and slopes on both sides of the mountains, while the traditional mountain huts were neglected. Many were victims of fires, such as Elbfallbaude, Riesenbaude, and Prinz-Heinrich-Baude. Similarly many hiking trails, ski jumps and luge tracks fell into disrepair due to lack of care. The cross-border hiking trail on the main ridge called "Polish–Czech Friendship Trail" was closed in the 1980s for all but Polish and Czechoslovak citizens. The mountains are on the route of main Sudetes hiking trail, Główny Szlak Sudecki (440 km from Świeradów Zdrój to Prudnik), which follows the main ridge. Today, the Giant Mountains are a popular holiday destination in both summer and winter.

Winter sport
The Giant Mountains are a traditional winter sports centre in Central Europe. The largest mountain resorts are located on the Czech side in Pec pod Sněžkou, Špindlerův Mlýn, Harrachov and Janské Lázně and on the Polish side in Szklarska Poręba, Karpacz and Kowary.

Much earlier however heavy sledges already transported timber and hay whereas smaller and more manoeuvrable sledges, so called "Hitsch'n", were used to get faster from the ridges down into the valleys. Races with both types of sledges were a popular pastime among the locals and became an attraction for tourists. As sledging became more and more popular competitions were organized, the most popular and earliest during the late 19th century in Johannisbad (Janské Lázně). Around 1900, 3,930 sledges with long horn-shaped runners and 6,000 sport sledges were counted on both sides of the mountains.

Nordic skiing was introduced during the same time when in 1880 Dr. Krause from Hirschberg (Jelenia Gora) bought some Norwegian skis in Stettin (Szczecin). A pair of them, the first recorded skis in the Giant Mountains, ended up at the Peterbaude (Petrovka). The locals however didn't know their purpose, and it wasn't until Fridtjof Nansens "Paa ski over Grønland" (The First Crossing of Greenland) was translated into German in 1891 that skiing became popular. At the same year the first ski manufacture of Austria-Hungary was established in Jungbuch (Mladé Buky) by master carpenter Franz Baudisch. The first crossing of the main ridge was done in 1892/93. Skiing as a popular sport was mainly brought forward by forest wardens, teachers and industrialists and business people who provided money to create and maintain the needed infrastructure and sponsored equipment for poorer people and schools.

Around 1900 a number of sports clubs were founded in the Giant Mountains. The leading role of the region back then was emphasised by the fact that 5 of the 12 founding clubs of the Austrian Ski Federation (ÖSV) were located in this part of the Bohemia, that the office of the ÖSV was located in Hohenelbe (Vrchlabí) for the first three years (afterwards it moved to Vienna and finally Innsbruck) and that the first president of the ÖSV was Guido Rotter, a local from the mountains. The clubs on the Silesian side were part of the German Ski Association (DSV). After the breakup of Austro-Hungary and the creation of Czechoslovakia the German clubs of the Bohemian side of the Giant mountains joined the newly founded HDW, an association for all German winter sports clubs in Czechoslovakia, whereas the small Czech minority joined the Svaz lyžařů, an association for all Czech winter sports clubs.

The towns and villages of the Giant Mountains became a popular venue for national and international competitions, its athletes ranked among the best of the era. The first German Nordic combined champion was a local, the competition itself was staged in Schreiberhau (Szklarska Poręba). Schreiberhau also hosted several luge championships. Martin Tietze and his sister Friedel from neighbouring Brückenberg (Karpacz) won the European luge championships many times. The first Rendezvous race, predecessor of today's Nordic Ski Championships, was hosted by Johannisbad, the majority of the competitions were won by HDW athletes.

Hiking
The mountain range is traversed by the cross-border hiking trail along the main ridge called the "Polish–Czech Friendship Trail". The start point is located on Szrenica and the end in the Okraj Pass/Pomezní boudy; the length of the trail is approx. 30 km; the level of difficulty is moderate. The trail partially overlaps with ski trails.

Mountain biking and cycling
There are hundreds of kilometres of cycling and cross country roads, natural single tracks and demanding rock garden downhill courses in Karkonosze National Park. Mountain biking trails run across Polish and Czech Republic's borders and are set against forested mountain sides, green pastures, lakes and cold rivers.

Legend and literature
The Giant Mountains is the legendary home of Rübezahl, a half-mischievous, half-friendly goblin of German folklore.

The Giant Mountains provide the setting for Friedrich de la Motte Fouqué's "Der Hirt des Riesengebürgs," or "The Shepherd of the Giant Mountains".

Important towns 
 Harrachov in the Czech Republic
 Karpacz, ski resort in Poland
 Kowary in Poland
 Janské Lázně in the Czech Republic
 Pec pod Sněžkou, mountain resort in the Czech Republic
 Szklarska Poręba, ski resort in Poland
 Špindlerův Mlýn, mountain resort in the Czech Republic

Resources 
 Opera Corcontica – Scientific journal from the Krkonoše National Park

Gallery

See also 
Grzbiet Lasocki

Notes

External links 

 Giant Mountains website 
 Official tourist website of the Krkonose 
 Official Krkonoše národní park website 
 Official Karkonoski Park Narodowy website 
 Riesengebirge Club 
 Giant Mountains On The Bike – Photography 

Sudetes
Mountain ranges of the Czech Republic
Mountain ranges of Poland